The Everly Brothers Sing Great Country Hits is an album by the Everly Brothers, originally released in 1963. It was re-released on CD in 2005 on the Collectors' Choice Music label.

Reception

Allmusic stated in their review: "The singing is some of the most beautiful in the Everlys' output, and the arrangements are models of creative simplicity — and for fans of the duo, it's almost as essential a record as Roots."

Track listing
Side one
 "Oh Lonesome Me" (Don Gibson) – 2:17
 "Born to Lose" (Frankie Brown, Ted Daffan) – 2:24
 "Just One Time" (Don Gibson) – 2:19
 "Send Me the Pillow That You Dream On" (Hank Locklin) – 2:32
 "Release Me" (Eddie Miller, Dub Williams, Robert Yount) – 2:21
 "Please Help Me, I'm Falling" (Hal Blair, Don Robertson) – 2:24
Side two
"I Walk the Line" (Johnny Cash) – 2:40
 "Lonely Street" (Carl Belew, Kenny Sowder, W.S. Stevenson) – 2:22
 "Silver Threads and Golden Needles" (Dick Reynolds, Jack Rhodes) – 2:16
 "I'm So Lonesome I Could Cry" (Hank Williams) – 2:57
 "Sweet Dreams" (Don Gibson) – 2:48
 "This Is the Last Song I'm Ever Going to Sing" (Jerry Allison, Sonny Curtis) – 2:15

Personnel
Don Everly – guitar, vocals
Phil Everly – guitar, vocals

References

External links
Collector's Choice Music reissue liner notes by Richie Unterberger.

1963 albums
The Everly Brothers albums
Warner Records albums
Covers albums